Wycombe Rural District was, from 1894 to 1974, a rural district in the administrative county of Buckinghamshire, England.

Origins
The district had its origins in the Wycombe Poor Law Union, which had been created in 1835, covering High Wycombe and several surrounding parishes. In 1872 sanitary districts were established, giving public health and local government responsibilities for rural areas to the existing boards of guardians of poor law unions. The Wycombe Rural Sanitary District therefore covered the area of the poor law union except for the town of High Wycombe, which was a municipal borough (officially called Chepping Wycombe until 1946) and so became its own urban sanitary district. The Wycombe Rural Sanitary District was administered from Wycombe Union Workhouse, which had been built in 1843 in open countryside in the parish of Saunderton, nearly five miles north-west of High Wycombe.

Under the Local Government Act 1894, rural sanitary districts became rural districts from 28 December 1894. The Wycombe Rural District Council held its first meeting on 31 December 1894 at the workhouse. William Morris was appointed the first chairman of the council.

Area and parishes
The district consisted of a number of rural parishes surrounding High Wycombe. In 1934 it was enlarged, when a county review order added the area of the abolished Hambleden Rural District.

Premises
The council continued to be based at the workhouse in Saunderton until the First World War, when the building was taken over for military purposes. Meetings were held at High Wycombe Guildhall for the next few years, with staff based at various offices. In 1928 the council acquired 17 High Street in High Wycombe, converting it to become their offices and meeting place. The council remained based at 17 High Street until 1967, when it moved to a newly built office building called Bellfield House at 80 Oxford Road in High Wycombe. The council remained at Bellfield House until its abolition in 1974.

Abolition
Wycombe Rural District was abolished under the Local Government Act 1972, merging with the borough of High Wycombe and Marlow Urban District to become Wycombe District. Bellfield House was used as secondary offices for the new council for some years, but was subsequently demolished in the early 2000s.

References

Districts of England created by the Local Government Act 1894
Districts of England abolished by the Local Government Act 1972
History of Buckinghamshire
Local government in Buckinghamshire
Rural districts of England